César Henríquez (born November 1, 1981) is a Chilean former footballer. His younger brother, Ángelo, is also a professional footballer, currently playing for Chilean club Universidad de Chile.

Honours

Club
Universidad de Chile
 Primera División de Chile (1): 2004 Apertura

External links
 
 Profile at america.com.co 

1981 births
Living people
Footballers from Santiago
Chilean footballers
Chile under-20 international footballers
Chilean expatriate footballers
Universidad de Chile footballers
Club Deportivo Palestino footballers
O'Higgins F.C. footballers
Deportes Melipilla footballers
América de Cali footballers
Panthrakikos F.C. players
Chilean Primera División players
Categoría Primera A players
Super League Greece players
Chilean expatriate sportspeople in Colombia
Chilean expatriate sportspeople in Greece
Expatriate footballers in Colombia
Expatriate footballers in Greece
Association football midfielders